Thomas Bailly was a Member of Parliament for Leicester (UK Parliament constituency) in September 1397.

References

14th-century births
Year of death missing
14th-century English people